Baby Rocks is a populated place situated in Navajo County, Arizona, United States, and appears on the Baby Rocks U.S. Geological Survey Map.

Notable person
Sylvia Laughter, Arizona state legislator and activist, was born in Baby Rocks.

References

Populated places in Navajo County, Arizona